Carl Zeiss Meditec AG is a multinational medical technology company and subsidiary of Carl Zeiss AG. It manufactures tools for eye examinations and medical lasers as well as solutions for neurosurgery, dentistry, gynecology and oncology. Among its products are the most common tools used by ophthalmologists and optometrists.

In October 2018, Carl Zeiss Meditec won FDA premarket approval for its ReLEx Smile laser system.

Also in October 2018, Carl Zeiss Meditec announced the acquisition of Reno, Nevada-based IanTech for an undisclosed sum.

In September 2019, Carl Zeiss Meditec launched the CIRRUS 6000 at the European Society of Retina Specialists 2019 Congress.

References

External links

Manufacturing companies of Germany
Companies based in Thuringia
Meditec
Meditec
Companies in the TecDAX
Companies in the MDAX